Gazeta Basarabiei was a newspaper from Chișinău, Bessarabia, founded in 1935.

Overview

Between 24 October and 17 November 1923, Gazeta Basarabiei was a weekly of the Romanian National Party, edited by Ion Pelivan and Constantin Mâțu.

Between November 14, 1935 and 1940, Gazeta Basarabiei was an independent newspaper ("Ziar popular independent de pură informație"), directed by Ion T. Costin and V. Boldescu served as editor in chief.

References

Bibliography 
 Constantin Mâțu, O necessitate desconsiderată: Presa românească în Basarabia, Chișinău, 1930.
 Eugen Ștefan Holban, Dicționar cronologic: Prin veacurile învolburate ale Moldovei dintre Prut și Nistru, Chișinău, 1998.

External links 
 PRESA BASARABEANĂ de la începuturi pînă în anul 1957. Catalog

1940 disestablishments in Romania
1935 establishments in Romania
Defunct newspapers published in Moldova
Mass media in Chișinău
Newspapers published in Moldova
Publications established in 1935
Publications disestablished in 1940
Romanian-language newspapers published in Moldova